The 1913 Villanova Wildcats football team represented the Villanova University during the 1913 college football season. The Wildcats team captain was Arthur Frost.

Schedule

References

Villanova
Villanova Wildcats football seasons
Villanova Wildcats football